Mount Pleasant station is an Amtrak intercity train station in Mount Pleasant, Iowa. The Chicago, Burlington and Quincy Railroad built the pressed brick depot in 1912. The contractors were J. Louis Whitney and K.A. Bergdah, two prominent Mt. Pleasant builders at that time. Using funds received under the American Recovery and Reinvestment Act of 2009, Amtrak installed a new wheelchair lift and enclosure at the station in 2010.

The Mount Pleasant station has a waiting area and lobby open to the public 365 days a year. The ticket office is staffed for ticket sales and baggage service Monday-Friday excluding holidays or when the agent is out sick or on vacation.

Mount Pleasant is also served by intercity buses from Burlington Trailways. However, the intercity bus stop is located 1.8 miles east of Mount Pleasant station, at the Heidelburg Motel at 2005 East Washington Street.

References

External links

Mount Pleasant Amtrak Station (USA RailGuide -- TrainWeb)

Amtrak stations in Iowa
Transportation buildings and structures in Henry County, Iowa
Former Chicago, Burlington and Quincy Railroad stations